Pseudoditrichales is an order of haplolepideous mosses in the subclass Dicranidae. It comprises two families, Pseudoditrichaceae and Chrysoblastellaceae. Pseudoditrichaceae was previously placed in Bryales, while Chrysoblastellaceae is a new family erected for Chrysoblastella, which was previously placed in Ditrichaceae.

References 

Moss orders
Bryopsida